Josh Beaumont (born 24 March 1992) is a rugby union player for the Sale Sharks in the Aviva Premiership. He plays as a number 8, or a lock. His debut season in the Sale Sharks jersey was uneventful as well as his second season. During his third season at the club he became a regular starter under Steve Diamond. On 25 July 2016, he was named as Sale Sharks club captain for the 2016/17 season.

International career
After a stand-out 2014/15 season for Sale Sharks, Beaumont was called up to the England squad to play the Barbarians in May 2015. He started the match at number 8 and scored a try in a 73–12 demolition of the Barbarians side. Beaumont received his first call up to the senior England squad by new coach Eddie Jones on 13 January 2016 for the 2016 Six Nations. After missing the 2016 Six Nations and the 2016 summer tour of Australia due to injury, he was named in the provisional England squad for the 2016/17 season.

Personal life
Beaumont is the son of former England rugby union captain Bill Beaumont.
Josh studied Geography at Durham University between 2010–2013 and was part of St Aidan's College, Durham.

Beaumont has been in a relationship with fellow Durham University alumni Ailsa Mackie since early 2016.

References

1992 births
Living people
Alumni of St Aidan's College, Durham
Durham University RFC players
English rugby union players
Rugby union locks
Rugby union number eights
Rugby union players from Blackpool
Sale Sharks players